Pellegrino may refer to:

People
Peregrine Laziosi
Pellegrino (given name)
Pellegrino (surname)

Places
 Mount Pellegrino, an Italian mountain in Sicily
 Pellegrino Park, a municipal park in Marble Hill, Missouri
 Pellegrino Parmense, an Italian city of the province of Parma

Other uses
Joseph Pellegrino University Professor, a Harvard University professorship

See also 
 San Pellegrino (disambiguation)